A costotransverse ligament is a short fibrous band that connects a rib with the transverse process of vertebra. They are some of the ligaments that surround the costovertebral joint.

Types
There are three types of costotransverse ligaments in the human body: costo-transverse ligament (connects the posterior surface of the neck of the rib with the transverse process of the corresponding vertebrae); lateral costotransverse ligament (connects the non-articular part of the rib with the tip of transverse process); and superior costotransverse ligament (connects the upper border of the neck of the rib to the inferior border of the transverse process of the vertebrae above). In addition, some sources also list the inferior costotransverse ligament, and the posterior costotransverse ligament in this grouping.

Functions
 Support and prevent dislocation of ribs and limit the costotransverse joint to perform a gliding movement.
 Their posterior surfaces provide attachment points for the extensor muscles (deep group) of the back.

Thorax (human anatomy)
Ligaments